Akhtar Ayub (born 10 December 1987) is a cricketer.

He played in the 2006 U-19 Cricket World Cup for Pakistan in Sri Lanka.

He made his first-class debut for Khan Research Laboratories against Pakistan International Airlines at Rawalpindi in November 2006. He has also played in List A and Twenty20 matches for the Rawalpindi Rams.

References

1987 births
Living people
Pakistani cricketers
Khan Research Laboratories cricketers
Rawalpindi cricketers
United Bank Limited cricketers
Rawalpindi Rams cricketers
Cricketers from Attock